Lubuk may refer to the following places:

Indonesia
Lubuk Basung, West Sumatra
Lubuk Pakam, North Sumatra 
Lubuk Sikaping, West Sumatra

Malaysia
Lubuk China, Malacca
Lubuk Paku, Pahang
Lubuk Tupah, Kedah